"What Kind of Fool" is a song written and recorded by American country music artist Lionel Cartwright.  It was released in November 1991 as the second single from the album Chasin' the Sun.  The song reached number 24 on the Billboard Hot Country Singles & Tracks chart.

Chart performance

References

1992 singles
Lionel Cartwright songs
Songs written by Lionel Cartwright
MCA Records singles
1992 songs